Two in One Suit is a 1950 West German comedy film directed by Joe Stöckel and starring  Stöckel,  Wolf Albach-Retty and Olga Tschechowa. It was shot at the Bavaria Studios in Munich and on location around Schwabing. The film's sets were designed by the art directors Rudolf Pfenninger and Max Seefelder.

Cast
 Joe Stöckel as Thomas Bimslechner
 Wolf Albach-Retty as Otto Vogel
 Heini Göbel as Waldemar Zirngibl
 Olga Tschechowa as Catherine Turner
 Rudolf Reiff asNick Turner
 Hannes Keppler as 'Baron' Egon
 Trude Haefelin as Luise Brandstötter
 Elise Aulinger as Frau Bimslechner
 Gilda Bauermeister as Bessy Turner
 Rudolf Vogel as Gerichtsvollzieher
 Elfie Pertramer
 Franz Loskarn as Schutzmann
 Beppo Brem as Dienstmann
 Ulla Best
 Wolf Harro
 Alfred Pongratz
 Thea Aichbichler

References

Bibliography
 Stefanie Mathilde Frank. Wiedersehen im Wirtschaftswunder: Remakes von Filmen aus der Zeit des Nationalsozialismus in der Bundesrepublik 1949–1963. Vandenhoeck & Ruprecht, 2017.

External links 
 

1950 films
1950 comedy films
German comedy films
West German films
1950s German-language films
Films directed by Joe Stöckel
German black-and-white films
1950s German films
Films shot at Bavaria Studios